Meghan Emily Murphy is a Canadian writer, journalist, and founder of Feminist Current, a feminist website and podcast. Her writing, speeches, and talks have criticized third-wave feminism, male feminists, the sex industry, exploitation of women in mass media, censorship, and gender identity legislation. She is based in Vancouver.

Early life and education
From 2004, she attended Simon Fraser University (SFU) and in 2010 obtained a BA in Women's Studies. In 2012, she completed a master's degree in Gender, Sexuality and Women's Studies, also at SFU.

Career

Journalism
Murphy began her journalism career in 2009, working for the Vancouver-based F Word Feminist Media Collective; writing until 2012 for its blog, The F Word, and as a host, producer, and editor of its radio program. In 2011, she began writing regularly for rabble.ca and worked as rabble's podcast network producer from November 2012, and evening editor from 2013, until February 2016. In 2012 she undertook a practicum at The Tyee.

Feminist Current

Murphy founded Feminist Current website and podcast in 2012. Describing itself as "Canada's leading feminist website", its mission is to "provide a unique perspective on male violence against women, pop culture, politics, current events, sexuality, gender, and many other issues that are often underrepresented or misrepresented by mainstream, progressive, and feminist media sources".

Since 2012, she has had her own YouTube channel, The Same Drugs with Meghan Murphy: Conversations Outside the Algorithm, where she interviews guests about feminism. She streams the weekly video podcast  on YouTube, as well as Patreon, with interviews alongside licensed therapist Allie Huggins.

Views on trigger warnings, sexism, contemporary feminism and prostitution
Murphy has argued that trigger warnings amount to censorship, written about ageism within feminism, criticized liberal feminism, supported the MeToo movement, and questioned whether men can be feminists.
She has also argued that anti-bullying campaigns ignore sexism and the way young men are taught to view women. She has lambasted feminist group Femen, who, she argued in 2013, was "making feminism palatable for the male gaze", presenting "a vision of female liberation that looks like a sexy, naked, thin, white, blonde woman".
In January 2017, Murphy argued, in the context of a Washington Post editorial praising men for taking part in the 2017 Women's March, against making concessions to men to make them feel comfortable within feminism. It is not women who need to adapt, she wrote:

Murphy has criticized third-wave feminism as well, interpreting it as a backlash against second-wave and radical feminism. For example, she has criticized Slutwalk and the attempt to reclaim a word that has been used to shame women. She has been broadly critical of sex-positive feminism, observing in 2013: "That whole burlesque/sex work is empowering/feminist porn aspect of the third wave is making a mockery of the movement." More generally, she has said certain contemporary movements are "cult-like" in their efforts to shut down debates by calling people "phobic" (such as "whorephobic") or accusing them of "shaming" (as in "kink-shaming") if they fail to "toe the party line". In 2013, she called Twitter "a horrible place for feminism ... intellectual laziness is encouraged, oversimplification is mandatory, posturing is de rigueur, and bullying is rewarded".

Murphy is highly critical of the sex and porn industry, which she regards as "inherently misogynistic and exploitative". When Hugh Hefner died in 2017, Murphy called him a "billionaire who profited from women's subordination". In an interview with CBC Radio's The Current in 2018, she argued that sex dolls may reduce men's empathy for women by presenting women as, literally, objects.  She told Mic in 2015 that this includes public education, a strong welfare state, retraining police officers, and offering exit services for women. She has also been criticized by some feminists for her opposition to decriminalizing the purchase of sex.

Political views
Murphy identifies as a socialist feminist.

Opposition to transgender activism

rabble.ca
Murphy contributed as an editor and writer for Canadian online magazine rabble.ca beginning in 2011. In 2015, Murphy challenged a photograph of Laverne Cox's nude body in a magazine as being "defined by a patriarchal/porn culture, through plastic surgery" and "a sexualized object for public consumption". In response, a Change.org petition was created in May 2015 by sex workers' lobby group Maggie's Toronto, accusing her of racism and using transphobic language, and demanding that rabble end Murphy's association with the site. The petition was countered by a collective open letter in solidarity with Murphy signed by 22 international feminist organizations and over 215 individuals. The Change.org petition was rejected by rabble.
However, in October 2016 Murphy quit rabble.ca after  an article she wrote, critical of Planned Parenthood's use of the word "menstruators", had been published and then removed without informing her. Editor Michael Stewart felt that it had used transphobic language and gone against rabbles journalistic policy. In an email to Murphy, rabbles publisher, Kim Elliott, stated that "the piece denie[d] the gendered identity of trans men who menstruate by implying that if a person has ovaries and a uterus, they are by virtue of those biological markers, a woman".

Opposition to gender identity legislation
Murphy is critical of gender identity legislation. In May 2017, Murphy appeared before the Canadian Senate, together with Hilla Kerner of the Vancouver Rape Relief & Women's Shelter, to oppose Bill C-16, which encoded gender identity and gender expression into Canadian law. She told the Senate: "Treating gender as though it is either internal or a personal choice is dangerous and completely misunderstands how and why women are oppressed under patriarchy as a class of people ... The rights of women and girls are being pushed aside to accommodate a trend."

In 2019, she was invited to speak before the Scottish Parliament regarding gender identity laws and their impact on women's rights. At their public meeting in London, she told Woman's Place UK, "I see no empathy for women and girls on the part of trans activists, that is to say, those pushing gender identity ideology and legislation. What I see is bullying, threats, ostracization, and a misogynist backlash against the feminist movement and much of the work it's accomplished over years." In an interview with The Scotsman regarding her views about transgender rights legislation, Murphy stated:

Murphy has faced criticism due to her opposition to the establishment of transgender rights legislation, which has led to her being called "anti-transgender" by her opponents.

Twitter ban and lawsuit
In late 2018, Twitter changed its policy on hateful conduct and harassment to officially prohibit intentionally calling a trans person by the wrong pronouns or using their pre-transition names. Beginning in August 2018, Murphy stated that her Twitter account was locked more than once after she tweeted about issues involving trans women. Twitter permanently suspended Murphy's account in late November 2018, after she referred to Jessica Yaniv, a trans woman, as "him". On February 11, 2019, Murphy filed a lawsuit against Twitter in response to her banning. The suit was dismissed in early June, but Murphy stated that she intended to file an appeal.

Murphy's account was restored on November 20, 2022.

Public appearances and protests	
Murphy's public appearances have been subject to protests in Canada, notably in Vancouver and Toronto. In both cities, LGBTQ organizations have also criticized public libraries for allowing Murphy to book space for public appearances. Mayor of Toronto John Tory announced that he was "disappointed" in the library's decision to host Murphy's event, and said that the "highest of standards" should be set to ensure that "offensive commentary" is not hosted in city facilities. Official Opposition Culture Critic Jill Andrew, a queer-identifying member of the ONDP  Black Caucus, also objected to the event, saying "As a proud member of Toronto's queer community, I stand in solidarity with LGBTQ folks, as well as with local writers and members of the literary community who are standing up to oppose the [Toronto Public Library's] decision" to host "a person who publicly espouses hate speech". 

Tory asked City Librarian Vickery Bowles to reconsider the decision to permit Murphy's appearance. In response to the statements by the mayor, Murphy said, "It is unconscionable that the mayor of Toronto would attempt to pressure the [Toronto Public Library] to cancel this event...What I am saying is not controversial, and certainly is not hateful ... We deserve space for this conversation and our concerns deserve respect." Bowles defended the approval to host the event, noting that "Murphy has never been charged with or convicted of hate speech".

See also

 List of feminists
 Feminist views on transgender topics

Notes

References

Further reading

External links
Feminist Current

Living people
20th-century Canadian women writers
21st-century Canadian women writers
Canadian bloggers
Canadian feminists
Canadian socialist feminists
Canadian socialists
Canadian women bloggers
Canadian women journalists
Canadian women radio hosts
Feminism and transgender
Feminist bloggers
Writers from Vancouver
Simon Fraser University alumni
Year of birth missing (living people)